Herrell is a surname. Notable people with the surname include:

 Jamie Herrell (born 1994), actress and beauty queen
 Ron Herrell (born 1948), politician
 Walt Herrell (1889–1949), baseball player
 Yvette Herrell (born 1964), American politician

See also
 Herrell's Ice Cream, chain of ice cream stores